Kelly, also known as Douglas or Douglas Kelly Station, is an unincorporated community in Dale County, Alabama, United States.

Demographics
Kelly was listed in the 1970 U.S. Census as an incorporated community, but disincorporated before 1980.

History
A post office operated under the name Douglas from 1899 to 1923.

The T. L. Rosser Brick Company operated a brickworks in Kelly in the early 1900s.

References

Unincorporated communities in Dale County, Alabama
Unincorporated communities in Alabama
Populated places disestablished in 1971
Former municipalities in Alabama